The coat of arms of São Tomé and Príncipe consists of a peregrine falcon on the left and a grey parrot on the right holding a coat of arms with a palm in its center. The coat of arms is surmounted by a blue star. Above, there is a band that states the name of the country. At the base of the arms the national motto, "Unity, discipline, work" is inscribed.

Historical coat of arms
In 1935, the Portuguese colonies were officially assigned coats of arms that followed a standard design pattern.

References

Sao Tome and Principe
National symbols of São Tomé and Príncipe
Sao Tome and Principe
Sao Tome and Principe
Sao Tome and Principe
Sao Tome and Principe